Lilya Hadab (born 13 May 1999) is a Moroccan tennis player.

Hadab has a career high WTA doubles ranking of 1097 achieved on 26 September 2016.

Hadab made her WTA main draw debut at the 2017 Grand Prix SAR La Princesse Lalla Meryem in the doubles draw.

ITF Junior finals

Singles Finals (0–1)

Doubles finals (0–4)

References

External links
 
 

1999 births
Living people
Moroccan female tennis players
21st-century Moroccan women